Grunow may refer to:

German municipalities
Grünow
Grunow-Dammendorf
Grünow, Mecklenburg-Vorpommern

People
Albert Grunow (1826–1914), German-Austrian chemist and phycologist
Gertrud Grunow (1870–1944), first woman teacher at the Bauhaus art school.